Michał Jarosław Kubiak (born 23 February 1988) is a Polish professional volleyball player. He was a member of the Poland national team from 2011 to 2021. A participant in the Olympic Games (London 2012, Rio 2016, Tokyo 2020), two–time World Champion (2014, 2018), and the 2012 World League winner. At the professional club level, he plays for Panasonic Panthers.

Personal life
Michał Kubiak was born in Wałcz, Poland. He has an older brother Błażej, who is also a volleyball player. He is married to Monika. On 23 February 2014 (Kubiak's 26th birthday) their daughter Pola was born. They also have a second child.

Career
Before his career as an indoor volleyball player, Michał Kubiak played beach volleyball with Zbigniew Bartman. They won a gold medal at the European U18 Championship in 2004 and a silver medal at the World U18 Championship, also in 2004. Both Kubiak and Bartman gave up playing beach volleyball.

Clubs
Kubiak made his debut in the Polish volleyball league during the 2005/2006 season, and He played for three Polish clubs before moving to foreign leagues. In the 2008/2009 season, he played for Israeli club Hapoel Kiryat Ata. His career accelerated after good performances in the B squad of the Polish national team. After that he moved to Italian Serie A2 Volley Padwa. In the 2010/2011 season, he returned to the PlusLiga, specifically to AZS Politechnika Warszawska, where he played with Zbigniew Bartman again. He wanted to leave the Warsaw club in 2011, but the club stated that their contract was still valid and filed a lawsuit. Finally, Kubiak moved to Jastrzębski Węgiel. With this club, he won a silver medal in the World Club Championship 2011. In 2012/2013 season he won a bronze medal in the Polish Championships. In 2013/2014 the club advanced to the Final Four of the Champions League in Ankara and after defeating Zenit Kazan won the bronze medal. His team beat ZAKSA Kędzierzyn-Koźle in the last matches in the fight for a medal. Jastrzębski Węgiel, including Kubiak, ended the season with a second bronze in the Polish Championships. In July 2014, a year before his contract was due to end, Kubiak requested an early termination. The club agreed, and Kubiak was able to play for the Turkish club Halkbank Ankara for the season 2014/2015. Kubiak agreed with Jastrzębski Węgiel that after the end of the contract in Turkey, he would return to the Polish club. On 29 March 2015 he won the Turkish Cup with his team Halkbank Ankara. In the final match, his team beat Arkas Izmir 3-0 and Kubiak scored 11 points. After one season in Japan with the Panasonic Panthers, he renewed his contract until the end of the 2018/2019 season.

National team
Kubiak was first selected to represent the Polish national team by coach Andrea Anastasi in 2011. With the Polish team, he won three medals in 2011 - silver at the World Cup and two bronzes at the World League and the European Championship. He was a gold medalist at the World League 2012 in Sofia, Bulgaria. On 16 August 2014 he was selected to the Polish squad at the World Championship held in Poland. On 21 September 2014 Poland won the title of World Champion 2014. On 27 October 2014 he received a state award granted by the Polish President Bronisław Komorowski, the Gold Cross of Merit for outstanding sports achievements and worldwide promotion of Poland.

In November 2015 he was nominated for Polish Sports Personality of the Year by the Plebiscite of Przegląd Sportowy. He took 5th place in the list of 2015 Polish Sports Personality of the Year.

On 30 September 2018 Poland achieved title of the 2018 World Champion. Poland beat Brazil in the final 3-0 and defended the title from 2014. Kubiak received an individual award for the Best Outside Spiker and he was one of the main players in the team.

Controversies
In 2019, he made a comment against the Iranian people that led to his suspension by FIVB for six games. He said referring to the people of Iran: "The Iranians think they are great and the best and we are the worst. But I believe that they are fatal, malicious and damned people. For me, this nation doesn’t exist, even though they proudly call themselves Persians, not Arabs. Sometimes we have to play with them, but for me, they don’t exist."
In response, Iran national volleyball team head coach, Igor Kolakovic addressed kubiak in an instagram post: “Dear Michal Kubiak, you are the great volleyball player, but you have the right to make a mistake. Come to Iran, please, to see how wonderful people live here.” "

Honours

Clubs
 FIVB Club World Championship
  Doha 2011 – with Jastrzębski Węgiel
 AVC Asian Club Championship
  Taipei 2019 – with Panasonic Panthers
 National championships
 2014/2015  Turkish SuperCup, with Halkbank Ankara
 2014/2015  Turkish Cup, with Halkbank Ankara
 2015/2016  Turkish SuperCup, with Halkbank Ankara
 2015/2016  Turkish Championship, with Halkbank Ankara
 2017/2018  Emperor's Cup, with Panasonic Panthers
 2017/2018  Japanese Championship, with Panasonic Panthers
 2018/2019  Japanese Championship, with Panasonic Panthers

Youth national team
 Beach volleyball
 2004  CEV U18 European Championship, with Zbigniew Bartman
 2004  FIVB U19 World Championship, with Zbigniew Bartman

Individual awards
 2014: Polish Cup – Best Opposite Spiker
 2015: FIVB World League – Best Outside Spiker
 2016: Turkish Championship – Most Valuable Player
 2018: Japanese Championship – Most Valuable Player
 2018: FIVB World Championship – Best Outside Spiker
 2019: Japanese Championship – Most Valuable Player
 2019: AVC Asian Club Championship – Best Outside Spiker
 2021: FIVB Nations League – Best Outside Spiker

State awards
 2014:  Gold Cross of Merit
 2018:  Knight's Cross of Polonia Restituta

References

External links

 
 
 
 Player profile at LegaVolley.it 
 Player profile at PlusLiga.pl 
 Player profile at Volleybox.net

1988 births
Living people
People from Wałcz
Sportspeople from West Pomeranian Voivodeship
Polish men's volleyball players
Olympic volleyball players of Poland
Volleyball players at the 2012 Summer Olympics
Volleyball players at the 2016 Summer Olympics
Volleyball players at the 2020 Summer Olympics
Recipients of the Gold Cross of Merit (Poland)
Polish expatriate sportspeople in Israel
Expatriate volleyball players in Israel
Polish expatriate sportspeople in Italy
Expatriate volleyball players in Italy
Polish expatriate sportspeople in Turkey
Expatriate volleyball players in Turkey
Polish expatriate sportspeople in Japan
Expatriate volleyball players in Japan
Polish expatriate sportspeople in China
Expatriate volleyball players in China
AZS Olsztyn players
Projekt Warsaw players
Jastrzębski Węgiel players
Halkbank volleyball players
Outside hitters